Lupososhi is a constituency of the National Assembly of Zambia. It covers a rural area to the north of Lake Bangweulu in Lupososhi District of Northern Province.

List of MPs

References

Constituencies of the National Assembly of Zambia
1983 establishments in Zambia
Constituencies established in 1983